The 2021 General Tire 125 was a ARCA Menards Series East race held on May 14, 2021, at the Dover International Speedway in Dover, Delaware. It was contested over 125 laps on the  oval. It was the fourth race of the 2021 ARCA Menards Series East season. Joe Gibbs Racing driver Ty Gibbs collected his first win of the East Series season.

Background

Entry list 

 (R) denotes rookie driver.
 (i) denotes driver who is ineligible for series driver points.

Practice/Qualifying 
Practice and Qualifying were combined for this race. The fastest lap in practice counted as a qualifying lap. Ty Gibbs won the pole with a time of 23.168 seconds and a speed of

Starting Lineups

Race

Race results

References 

2021 in sports in Delaware
General Tire 125
2021 ARCA Menards Series East